The Who Was? Show is a sketch comedy and history program which ran for one season on Netflix, in which Andy Daly's character, Ron, interacts with a group of teenagers; interspersed with historical vignettes and narrated by H. Jon Benjamin. The show is based on the Who Was...? book series, published since 2002, and premiered on May 11, 2018. The show was nominated for the Daytime Emmy Award for Outstanding Children's Series in 2019. One of the actors on the show, Zach Timson, confirmed that the show was canceled after one season on his TikTok page.

Characters
Andy Daly – Portrayed Ron, the somewhat dim-witted C.E.O. of the show
Kirrilee Berger – Portrayed:
Joan of Arc
Amelia Earhart
Wilbur Wright
Many other minor characters
Lilla Crawford – Portrayed:
William Shakespeare
Marie Antoinette
Susan B. Anthony
Orville Wright
Queen Elizabeth I
Christopher Columbus (Guest)
Many other minor characters
Bentley Green – Portrayed:
Tutankhamun
Louis Armstrong
George Washington
George Washington Carver
Many other minor characters
Adam Hochstetter – Portrayed:
Benjamin Franklin
Blackbeard
Galileo
Julius Caesar
Wolfgang Amadeus Mozart (Guest)
Many other minor characters
Zach Timson – Portrayed:
Albert Einstein
Isaac Newton
Harry Houdini
Marco Polo
Pablo Picasso
Thomas Jefferson (Guest)
Henry VIII (Guest)
Alexander the Great (Guest)
Many other minor characters
Haley Tju – Portrayed:
Mahatma Gandhi
Sacagawea
Frida Kahlo
Marie Curie
Genghis Khan
Many other minor characters
Dallas Liu – Portrayed:
Bruce Lee (Dallas Liu)
(Appeared throughout the first season and Ron, as a running gag, insisted he be on the show, calling him "Brucie". He finally got to be in the season finale to fight Julius Caesar.)
John Hodgman-Portrayed:
The Explanationator
(An animated superhero character who appeared in episodes 2, 8, and 11.)
Brian McCann
Monsieur Tidbits
(An animated French dog who appeared in episodes 2, 3, 4, 5, and 13.)
Princess Tutbits
(An animated Egyptian sphinx (and relative of Monsieur Tidbits) who appeared in episode 3.)

Episodes

References

External links
 
 

2018 American television series debuts
2018 American television series endings
2010s American children's comedy television series
2010s American sketch comedy television series
American children's education television series
Children's sketch comedy
English-language Netflix original programming
Netflix children's programming
Television series about teenagers
Television series by Matador Content
Television series by FremantleMedia Kids & Family